Timothy P. Daggett (born May 22, 1962) is a former American gymnast and an Olympic gold medalist.  He is a graduate of West Springfield High School and UCLA, who competed in the 1984 Los Angeles Olympics, along with Bart Conner, Peter Vidmar and Mitch Gaylord. There, Daggett scored a perfect 10 on the high bar, assisting his team in winning a gold medal – the first for the U.S. men's gymnastics team in Olympic history. In addition to team gold, he earned an individual bronze medal on the pommel horse. In 2005, he was inducted into the United States Olympic Hall of Fame.

Personal life
In West Springfield, Massachusetts, at the age of 10, Daggett began his future career in gymnastics by enrolling in the Parks and Recreation program. Advancing quickly, the local high school coach invited Daggett to train with his team. While he was a college student at UCLA, he competed in NCAA Division I gymnastics. He graduated from UCLA in 1986 with a degree in psychology.

Daggett is married to Deanne (née Lazer), formerly a collegiate level gymnast at Eastern Michigan University and now an M.D. practicing anesthesiology. Their children are Peter and Carlie Daggett. Tim named his son Peter after teammate Peter Vidmar. Peter's son Tim is named after Tim Daggett. They all currently live in East Longmeadow, Massachusetts.

Medical history 
Daggett's ankles had historically been weak. In 1980, Daggett dislocated one ankle shortly after having the other rebuilt. For months in 1986, he was forced to recover from his two ankles again being rebuilt. Immediately following the recovery during training, his high bar release ended with him landing on his neck. The result was a ruptured spinal disc, and left arm nerves were also damaged. Daggett, against doctor recommendations, ignored the proposed surgery, which would have ended his career, and caught mononucleosis following his recovery from the near-fatal landing. In Rotterdam, the 1987 world championships proved career-shattering for Daggett. On the vault, he snapped his tibia and fibula and severed one of his arteries following the impact from a pike Cuervo. He underwent surgeries adding and removing supportive braces and pins to his left leg. He was under sedation from morphine in hospitals for three months.

Gymnastics record

U.S. Nationals
 1981 — 12th AA
 1982 — 4th AA, 5th PH, 6th RG (tie), 6th PB,
 1983 — 5th AA, 1st PH, 2nd HB
 1984 — 4th AA, 5th FX, 1st PH, 2nd RG (tie), 1st PB (tie), 1st HB (tie)
 1985 — 3rd AA, 2nd PH, 1st PB, 3rd FX
 1986 — 1st AA, 6th PH, 3rd RG, 3rd V, 1st PB, 4th HB
 1988 — 43rd AA (withdrew due to injury), 5th PH

U.S. Olympic trials 
 1984 — 3rd AA
 1988 — 23rd AA (withdrew due to injury)

World Championships
 1983 — 4th Team
 1985 — 9th Team, 25th AA
 1987 — 9th Team (During the vault, Daggett suffered shattered bones in his left leg in an unfortunate landing)

Olympics 
 1984 — 1st Team, 3rd PH, 4th HB (tie)

Post-retirement career
Since his retirement following the 1988 Summer Olympics in Seoul, Daggett has worked as a television commentator, covering the gymnastics events for NBC at the Summer Olympics in Barcelona, Atlanta, Sydney, Athens, Beijing, London, Rio and Tokyo. He is the primary commentator for NBC gymnastics. He comments with Elfi Schlegel, Al Trautwig, John Tesh, Nastia Liukin, John Roethlisberger, Amanda Borden, and Andrea Joyce.

He is also the proprietor of a gymnastics facility in Agawam, Massachusetts that features competitive Boys and Girls Team Programs, as well as more basic classes for toddlers and young children. Similarly, Daggett’s facility hosts open gym sessions that are welcome to all, as well as a Martial Arts class. He coaches the competitive Boys Junior Olympic Team Program. He has had multiple national champions and national team members come from his gym. The Tim Daggett National Invitational, held at the Springfield MassMutual Center, is an annual gymnastics competition in January hosted by Daggett himself.

Notes

References

External links

1962 births
American color commentators
American male artistic gymnasts
Gymnastics broadcasters
Gymnasts at the 1984 Summer Olympics
Gymnasts at the 1987 Pan American Games
Gymnasts at the 1988 Summer Olympics
Living people
Medalists at the 1984 Summer Olympics
Olympic bronze medalists for the United States in gymnastics
Olympic Games broadcasters
Olympic gold medalists for the United States in gymnastics
Pan American Games bronze medalists for the United States
Pan American Games gold medalists for the United States
Pan American Games medalists in gymnastics
People from East Longmeadow, Massachusetts
UCLA Bruins men's gymnasts
Medalists at the 1987 Pan American Games